Toyota Motor Hokkaido (TMH) is a manufacturing subsidiary of Toyota established in 1991 and focuses on the production of transmissions and powertrain-related parts. Its headquarters and assembly plant are located in Tomakomai, Hokkaido.

History
As part of Toyota's efforts to disperse production bases in Hokkaido, Tomakomai was chosen because of its vast land area, excellent logistics due to the Tomakomai Port, and the ability to procure aluminum locally.

IN 1990, Toyota announced it would open a facility in Tomakomai and Toyota Motor Hokkaido was established of February 8 the following year.
In 1992, production of the aluminum wheel began and ended in 2010. In 1993, TMH began producing automatic transmission and the completion ceremony of the factory took place in the same year. In 1999, it acquired "ISO 14001" certification. In 2001, TMH chieved zero emissions and started using natural gas the following year. In 2004, "Yuhokai", a business partner cooperative association was established. In 2005, the No. 4 factory (machine shop) was completed and the following year, TMH began producing continuously variable transmission (CVT). IN 2008, the No. 5 factory (forging factory) completed. In 2012, TMH began producing hybrid transaxles.

References

Citations

Toyota subsidiaries
Toyota Group